Robert Haughton is an Irish lawyer who has been a Judge of the Court of Appeal since November 2019. He has been the chair of the Constituency Commission and was a Judge of the High Court between 2014 and 2019.

Early life 
Haughton was educated at Trinity College Dublin and the King's Inns. He was called to the Bar in 1979 and became a senior counsel in 2004.

He was the chair of Bloomfield Hospital between 2005 and 2012.

Judicial career

High Court 
Haughton became a High Court judge in October 2014.

In July 2019, he noted that no woman had been appointed an examiner since the process was established in Ireland. The following day Sarah-Jane O’Keeffe became the first female examiner in the State.

Constituency Commission 
He was appointed by the Chief Justice of Ireland to chair the Constituency Commission in July 2016 to review the boundaries of Dáil constituencies and Irish European Parliament constituencies. The committee increased the number of Teachta Dála from 158 and 160 and left the boundaries for European elections unchanged.

He was appointed to review the European Parliament constituencies again in 2018 following the increase in seats allocated to Ireland following Brexit. The committee increased by one the numbers of seats in Ireland South and Dublin.

Court of Appeal 
He was one of seven appointments to the Court of Appeal in November 2019. This followed a change in the law in order to increase the number of judges to sit on the Court of Appeal.

References 

Living people
Alumni of Trinity College Dublin
Judges of the Court of Appeal (Ireland)
High Court judges (Ireland)
21st-century Irish judges
Year of birth missing (living people)
Alumni of King's Inns